西湖 (literally "west lake") may refer to:

Saiko (Yamanashi), one of the Fuji Five Lakes, located in Yamanashi Prefecture, Japan
West Lake or Xī Hú, a fresh water lake located in central Hangzhou, Zhejiang province, China

See also 
West Lake (disambiguation)